Shawn Daniels (born September 3, 1966) is a Canadian former Canadian football fullback who played fourteen seasons in the Canadian Football League with the Saskatchewan Roughriders, Ottawa Rough Riders, Calgary Stampeders, Edmonton Eskimos and Toronto Argonauts. He was drafted by the Hamilton Tiger-Cats in the third round of the 1988 CFL Draft. He played college football at Bowling Green State University.

Professional career
Daniels was selected by the Hamilton Tiger-Cats of the CFL with the nineteenth pick in the 1988 CFL Draft. He was traded, along with a first round pick in the 1989 Draft, to the Saskatchewan Roughriders for Peter Giftopolous in August 1988. Shawn played in ten games for the Roughriders during the 1989 season. He played in fifty games for the CFL's Ottawa Rough Riders from 1990 to 1993. He played in twelve games for the Saskatchewan Roughriders in 1994. Daniels played in 24 games for the Calgary Stampeders of the CFL from 1994 to 1995. He played in twelve games for the Ottawa Rough Riders during the 1996 season. He was selected by the Saskatchewan Roughriders in the 1997 CFL Dispersal Draft due to the Ottawa Rough Riders folding. Daniels played in 43 games for the Saskatchewan Roughriders from 1997 to 1999. He played in 33 games for the Edmonton Eskimos of the CFL from 2000 to 2001. He played in seventeen games for the Toronto Argonauts of the CFL during the 2002 season.

References

External links
Just Sports Stats

Living people
1966 births
Canadian football fullbacks
American football fullbacks
Canadian players of American football
Bowling Green Falcons football players
Hamilton Tiger-Cats players
Saskatchewan Roughriders players
Ottawa Rough Riders players
Calgary Stampeders players
Edmonton Elks players
Toronto Argonauts players
Players of Canadian football from Quebec
Canadian football people from Montreal